Harrington is a small village located on the northern entrance of the Manning River in New South Wales, Australia. It was established in 1853 and proclaimed a village on 26 September 1896. At the 2021 census, Harrington had a population of 3,381. It was named after the Earl of Harrington by the explorer, John Oxley.

Schools
 Harrington Public School

Emergency Services
 Marine Rescue Crowdy Harrington
 SES
 RFS

References

External links

Fishing communities in Australia
Mid North Coast
Suburbs of Mid-Coast Council
Towns in New South Wales
Coastal towns in New South Wales